"‎I'm So Blessed" is a song performed by American Christian country band Cain. The song impacted Christian radio in the United States on July 15, 2022, as the fourth single from their debut studio album, Rise Up (2021). The song was written by Jonathan Smith, Logan Cain, Madison Cain, Matthew West, and Taylor Cain. The production of the single was handled by David Leonard, Brad King, and Seth Talley.

"‎I'm So Blessed" peaked at number four on the US Hot Christian Songs chart.

Background
Cain released "I'm So Blessed" to Christian radio in the United States on July 15, 2022. Being the fourth single from their debut album Rise Up (2021), "I'm So Blessed" follows previously released singles "Rise Up (Lazarus)," "Yes He Can," and "The Commission." On September 9, 2022, Cain released a new version of "I'm So Blessed" featuring rapper Aaron Cole. On October 13, 2022, the band released "I'm So Blessed (Best Day Remix)." On December 9, 2022, the band released I’m So Blessed (Child Of God Collection), an EP containing six versions of the song.

Composition

Critical reception
Timothy Yap of JubileeCast opined that the song is "a little too self-absorbed lyrically," while ultimately being "saved by its infectious pop-centric chorus." 365 Days of Inspiring Media's Joshua Andre gave a positive review of the song, saying it is "a gospel infused worship anthem that basically recounts that our providence over us from God is because of who He is and not due to anything that we have done or will ever do."

Commercial performance
"‎I'm So Blessed" made its debut at number 49 on the US Christian Airplay chart dated July 30, 2022.

"‎I'm So Blessed" debuted at number 13 on the US Hot Christian Songs chart dated January 7, 2023, being the highest ranking debut that week.

Music videos
The official audio video of "I'm So Blessed" was published on Cain's YouTube channel on May 7, 2021. The official music video for "I'm So Blessed" premiered on Cain's YouTube channel on July 15, 2022. The music video was filmed on location in Sherman Oaks, California.

Cain released the "I'm So Blessed (Best Day Remix)" performance video filmed at K-Love on November 4, 2022, on YouTube. On December 15, 2022, Cain issued the official live performance video of the song via YouTube. The Song Session video of the song was availed by Essential Worship on January 27, 2023, to YouTube.

Track listing

Charts

Weekly charts

Year-end charts

Release history

References

External links
 
 

2020 songs
2022 singles